Duaner Sánchez (born October 14, 1979) is a Dominican former professional baseball player. He is a right-handed relief pitcher. During his Major League Baseball (MLB) career, Sánchez pitched for Arizona Diamondbacks, Pittsburgh Pirates, Los Angeles Dodgers, New York Mets and San Diego Padres. He is known for his distinctive sports goggles he wears while pitching.

Career
Sánchez was born October 14, 1979 in Cotuí, Dominican Republic. In 1996, Sánchez graduated from Francisco E. Carvajal High School.

Arizona Diamondbacks
In 1997, he was signed as an amateur free agent by the Arizona Diamondbacks and began his professional career in the Dominican Summer League.

On June 14, 2002, he made his major league debut, pitching a scoreless inning against the Detroit Tigers.

Pittsburgh Pirates
Three weeks later, he was traded to the Pittsburgh Pirates for pitcher Mike Fetters.

In 2003, he spent most of the season with the Triple-A Nashville Sounds. In 2002 and 2003, Sánchez made 15 appearances with one win and a 12.75 ERA.

Los Angeles Dodgers
After the 2003 season, he was claimed off waivers by the Los Angeles Dodgers. In 2004, he began to achieve success, working 80 innings in 67 games with a 3.38 ERA.

In August 2005, he became the Dodgers temporary closer, earning eight saves while Éric Gagné remained on the disabled list.

New York Mets
In January 2006, the Los Angeles Dodgers traded Sánchez to the New York Mets along with Steve Schmoll in exchange for Jae Weong Seo and Tim Hamulack. Sánchez started 2006 by throwing 18 scoreless innings in 15 games while setting up for Mets closer Billy Wagner.

In the early morning hours on July 30, 2006, less than 24 hours prior to the 2006 trading deadline, Sanchez was injured in a taxicab accident in Miami, Florida on Interstate 95; the accident was caused by a drunk driver. Sanchez suffered a separated shoulder, and was flown to New York City to undergo season-ending surgery. The Mets front office learned about the full extent of the injury early on the morning of the trading deadline, but suppressed what had transpired until a trade had been made with the Pittsburgh Pirates that saw the Mets re-acquiring fellow relief pitcher Roberto Hernández, and starting pitcher Óliver Pérez.

In January 2007, Sanchez and the Mets agreed to a one-year, $850,000 contract for the 2007 season. Towards the end of Spring training in March 2007, Sanchez suffered a hairline fracture to a small bone (known as the coracoid) in the front of his shoulder. Although the injury was thought to be unrelated to the first injury caused during the taxicab accident, the accident likely weakened parts of the shoulder and the bone cracked when he started throwing again. Sanchez missed the entire 2007 season as a result of the fracture.

Sanchez was released by the Mets during Spring Training 2009. The Mets cited his lack of progress since his injury as the reason for his release.

San Diego Padres
On March 15, 2009, Sánchez signed a minor league contract with the San Diego Padres and was invited to spring training. He was released by the Padres on May 15.

Canada and Mexico
In 2010, Sanchez played for the Sussex Skyhawks of the Can-Am League and for the Diablos Rojos del México of the Mexican League.

Long Island Ducks
On April 11, 2011, the Long Island Ducks announced they signed Sanchez.

References

External links

1979 births
Living people
Águilas Cibaeñas players
Arizona Diamondbacks players
Diablos Rojos del México players
Dominican Republic expatriate baseball players in Mexico
Dominican Republic expatriate baseball players in the United States
El Paso Diablos players
Gigantes del Cibao players
High Desert Mavericks players
Lancaster JetHawks players

Long Island Ducks players
Los Angeles Dodgers players
Major League Baseball pitchers
Major League Baseball players from the Dominican Republic
Mexican League baseball pitchers
Missoula Osprey players
Nashville Sounds players
New Orleans Zephyrs players
New York Mets players
People from Cotuí
Pittsburgh Pirates players
San Diego Padres players
South Bend Silver Hawks players
St. Lucie Mets players
Sussex Skyhawks players
Tucson Sidewinders players
World Baseball Classic players of the Dominican Republic
2006 World Baseball Classic players